Daniel Joseph Pardus (born April 2, 1963) is an American former stock car racing driver. He was a regular on the NASCAR Goody's Dash Series, and also competed in events in the Busch and Winston Cup Series, as well as the ARCA Re/Max Series.

Racing career
A native of Port Orange, Florida, a suburb of Daytona Beach, Pardus, a graduate of Mainland High School, won back to back track championships at New Smyrna Speedway in 1980 and 1981. Pardus began racing in NASCAR's touring series in 1992, competing in the Goody's Dash Series, a series for four-cylinder subcompact cars. He ran in the series for several years, running a Chevrolet Cavalier and, later, a Pontiac Grand Am; he joined Jim & Judie Motorsports, the team he would run the majority of the remainder of his racing career for, before the 1995 season.

Pardus moved to the ARCA Re/MAX Series, a full-size stock car series, in 1997; running approximately half the series schedule, he placed third in the series' Rookie of the Year award standings and 12th overall. He ran only five races in the series in 1998, as he attempted to make his debut at the top level of NASCAR competition, the Winston Cup Series; he failed to qualify for a number of races through the season, and was injured early in the season in a practice crash at Texas Motor Speedway. In October he successfully made his debut, in what would prove to be his only start in the series, in the Pepsi 400 in October. Pardus finished 36th in the event, which had been delayed from July by extensive wildfires in central Florida.

Pardus entered the 1999 season intending to run the full 1999 Winston Cup Series schedule, competing for Rookie of the Year driving the No. 50 for Midwest Transit Racing. The team ran a limited schedule due to limited sponsorship; following his third failure to qualify in three attempts, at Charlotte Motor Speedway in May, Pardus was released as the team's driver, moving to a management position.

In 2000, driving for the Gardners, Pardus failed to qualify for the Daytona 500; after running a limited ARCA schedule in 2000, Pardus and the team moved to the NASCAR Busch Series in 2001, with sponsorship from The Outdoor Channel; he made his debut in the series at Nashville Superspeedway.  In his second Busch Series race, at Chicagoland Speedway,  Pardus was involved in a hard crash with David Donohue, suffering a broken back; he returned to competition later in the year, and ran a partial schedule in 2002, competing in twelve races, all but one for Jim & Judie Motorsports; the exception being a drive for Jay Robinson Racing in the GNC Live Well 250 at Daytona International Speedway; he also failed to qualify for six other races. Pardus' team hired pit crews from Winston Cup Series teams to pit their cars; at Nashville, due to a scheduling conflict, the crew for ML Motorsports pitted the car.

Following the 2002 season, The Outdoor Channel ended their sponsorship of Jim & Judie Motorsports; Pardus attempted to qualify for two races in 2003, at Daytona International Speedway and Darlington Raceway failing to qualify for both. Pardus would make one more attempt at a NASCAR start, in 2005 at Daytona, driving the No. 73 Chevrolet for Raabe Racing Enterprises in qualifying for the Pepsi 400; he failed to qualify for the event.

Personal life
Pardus is married, to Alice. He has two children, Danielle and Preston Pardus, both of whom also race cars; Preston won the Sports Car Club of America Spec Miata national championship in 2017.

He currently works as a utilities contractor, and worked as a part-time commentator for radio and TV broadcasts of racing events on SPEED Channel and HD Net, which he joined following his racing career.

Motorsports career results

NASCAR
(key) (Bold – Pole position awarded by qualifying time. Italics – Pole position earned by points standings or practice time. * – Most laps led.)

Winston Cup Series

Daytona 500

Busch Series

ARCA Re/Max Series
(key) (Bold – Pole position awarded by qualifying time. Italics – Pole position earned by points standings or practice time. * – Most laps led.)

References

External links
 

Living people
1963 births
People from Port Orange, Florida
Racing drivers from Florida
NASCAR drivers
ARCA Menards Series drivers
ISCARS Dash Touring Series drivers